Wolter Bakker (18 November 1888 – 16 December 1970) was a Dutch architect. His work was part of the architecture event in the art competition at the 1936 Summer Olympics.

References

External links
 

1888 births
1970 deaths
20th-century Dutch architects
Olympic competitors in art competitions
People from Steenwijkerland